A notifiable offence is any offence under United Kingdom law where the police must inform the Home Office, who use the report to compile crime statistics.  The term Notifiable Offence is sometimes confused with recordable offence.

Reporting notifiable offences 
There are strict rules regarding the recording of crime which is outlined in the National Crime Recording Standards and the Home Office Crime Counting Rules. An incident will be recorded as a crime (notifiable offence);

For offences against an identifiable victim if, on the balance of probability;

 The circumstances as reported amount to a crime defined by law (the police will determine this, based on their knowledge of the law and counting rules and,
 There is no credible evidence to the contrary.

For offences against the state (against society) the points to prove to evidence the offence must clearly be made out, before a crime is recorded. An offence is regarded as being "against the state" where there is no specific identifiable victim, an example being dangerous driving.

The following offences are generally categorised as notifiable offences;

violence, damage, firearms, public order
dishonesty, obscenity, drugs and sexual offences
data protection
the more serious road traffic offences

See also
Crime statistics in the United Kingdom
National Crime Recording Standards in England and Wales
Recordable offence

References

External links
The Home Office Counting Rules for Recorded Crime

Law enforcement
Law of the United Kingdom
Law enforcement in England and Wales
Crime statistics
Governance of policing in England
Governance of policing in Wales